Back Story is an autobiography by British actor, comedian, and writer David Mitchell. The book was published in October 2012. The book entails stories about Mitchell's childhood, schooling and career as a television personality, including personal anecdotes, rants, political commentary and pictures.

Synopsis 
The book revolves around a walk in Kilburn, London, on which Mitchell reflects on his childhood, university experiences and career. The book title is also a play-on-words, as Mitchell talks about the problems with his back.

Contents

Reception 
The book received generally positive reviews. The Guardian stated that it was an honest memoir, different from other celebrity memoirs and one that would resonate greatly with readers.

References

British autobiographies
Books about entertainers
2012 non-fiction books
HarperCollins books
Kilburn, London